Events from the year 1813 in Denmark.

Incumbents
 Monarch – Frederick VI
 Prime minister – Frederik Moltke

Events
 5 January - The heavy financial and economic burden of the Gunboat War with England takes its monetary toll: Danmark-Norway defaults on its foreign debt (Danish state bankruptcy of 1813).
 7 December – Battle of Bornhöved, part of the War of the Sixth Coalition, is fought Danish troops and Swedish cavalry at the small village of Bornhöft in the Duchy of Schleswig and results in Swedish victory.
 10 December – The Battle of Sehested is fought between Danish and Swedish (with Prussian-Russian battalions) troops at Sehested in Holstein and results in Danish victory.

Births
 3 February – Andreas Flinch, goldsmith, wood-engraver and lithographer (d. 1872)
 8 March – Johannes Steenstrup, natural scientist (d. 1897)
 4 April – Marie Toft, landowner (d. 1854)
 5 May – Søren Kierkegaard, theologian, philosopher, poet, social critic, and religious author (d. 1855)
 13 July – Theophil Hansen, architect who later became an Austrian citizen (d. 1891 in Austria)

Deaths
 9 March – Carl Frederik Stanley, sculptor (b. c. 1738)

References

 
1810s in Denmark
Denmark
Years of the 19th century in Denmark